The Battle of Delhi (1764) was fought between the Jat ruler of Bharatpur and the Mughal rulers of Mughal Empire. Maharaja Jawahar Singh of Bharatpur invaded Delhi and lay siege to stronghold of Red Fort. Military conflict between Jats and Mughals started and continued for several months and on February 1765 Mughals and Rohilas surrendered to the mighty Jats and Mughals agreed to pay war expenses to the Jats.

Background
On 25 December 1763, Najib-ad Daulah shot Jawahar Singh's father Maharaja Suraj Mal, killing him. Maharaja Sawai Jawahar Singh started preparing to avenge the death of his father.

Battle
Singh marched to Delhi with 60,000 soldiers of his own, 25,000 from Sikhs.  Jats plundered 12 colonies of Delhi and finally reached Shahjahanabad Fort, blocking supplies of Najib ad-Dawlah. Saharanpur and other possessions of the Rohilla Chief were plundered by the Jats. The citizens of Delhi came out of the Fort to the Jat camp for corn and other supplies, it was the surrender of the city to the Jats. 

After a siege of several months, Najib ad-Dawlah appealed for peace but Singh was determined to take revenge for his father by severing the head of Najib ad-Dawlah. After several days, some Rohilla leaders came to Singh's camp with Zubita Khan who sought the intervention of the Sikhs. They tried to persuade Singh to make peace on the condition that the whole expenditure for war would be repaid by Najib ad-Dawlah. 

Singh accepted this offer, partially insistence of his chiefs, including Balram Singh and Mohanram, and returned to Bharatpur along with Lohiya Gate and Ashtadhatu gate which had been brought to Delhi, 461 years ago, by Alauddin Khalji after his Siege of Chittorgarh Fort in 1303. These doors are located in the Lohagarh Fort of Bharatpur. In February 1765 a treaty was signed on payment of Rs. 60 Lakhs as war indemnity.

See also 
Plunder of Old Delhi (1753)
Capture of Agra (1761)
Battle of Delhi (disambiguation)

References 

Delhi 1764
1764 in India
18th century in Delhi
Delhi 1764
Delhi